Walter Frederic Adeney (14 March 1849 – 1 September 1920) was an English Congregationalist minister, theologian, and biblical scholar. Born in Ealing in 1849, he was educated at New College and University College London. He served as a minister in Acton from 1872 to 1889 and became a lecturer in biblical and systematic theology at New College, London, in 1887. He was promoted to a professorship in New Testament exegesis and church history at New College in 1889, before moving to become Principal of Lancashire Independent College in Manchester in 1903. In addition to the numerous works he wrote on the Bible, for both academic and popular audiences, Adeney was general editor of the Century Bible Commentary, and in 1908 he published an extensive history of Eastern Christianity, The Greek and Eastern Churches. He retired in 1913, and died in Lewes on 1 September 1920.

Selected works

References

External links

1849 births
1920 deaths
19th-century Christian biblical scholars
20th-century Christian biblical scholars
Alumni of University College London
British biblical scholars
Calvinist and Reformed biblical scholars
English Calvinist and Reformed theologians
English Congregationalist ministers
Historians of Christianity
Historians of the Russian Orthodox Church
New Testament scholars
People from Ealing
English biblical scholars